Chambersburg is an unincorporated community in Pike County, Illinois, United States.

See also
 List of unincorporated communities in Illinois

Notes and references

Unincorporated communities in Pike County, Illinois
Unincorporated communities in Illinois